Salvazaon metallicum is a species of beetle in the family Cerambycidae. It was described by Pic in 1928.

References

Desmiphorini
Beetles described in 1928